This is a list of existing cinemas and cinemas in Oceania.

Cinema chains

Cinemas

American Samoa

Australia

Fiji
There are three independent cinemas in Fiji.

French Polynesia

Guam

Marshall Islands

Micronesia

New Caledonia

New Zealand

Northern Mariana Islands

Papua New Guinea
Papua New Guinea has one cinema.

Samoa

Tonga
Tonga currently has no cinemas, however one cinema, known as Star Cinema, opened in Nukuʻalofa in 2005 but was destroyed during the Nukuʻalofa riots of 2006.

Vanuatu
Vanuatu has one cinema, which shows films in both English and French.

References

Notes

Oceania